Born and Raised is the fourth studio album by Queensbridge rapper Cormega. It was released on October 20, 2009, after being pushed back several times; the album was originally to be titled Urban Legend but was changed to Born and Raised after rapper T.I. used the original title for his 2004 release (Cormega mentions this on his Who Am I DVD of video of him circa 2003). The album was met with mostly positive reviews from both fans and critics.

The song "Fresh", featuring Big Daddy Kane, KRS-One, Grand Puba, PMD and DJ Red Alert was leaked onto the internet in the middle of 2008. This caused Cormega to replace the original version, produced by Emile, with a remix by Buckwild re-titled as "Mega Fresh X" for the retail album.

Track listing 

 Notes
  signifies a co-producer

Samples 
 "Dirty Game"
 "Once Upon a Time (You Were a Friend of Mine)" by Barry White
 "Rapture"
 "Mother's Theme (Mama)" by Willie Hutch
 "Size 'Em Up" by Big L
 "Define Yourself"
 "Go On and Cry" by Les McCann
 "Love Your Family"
 "The Best of My Love" by T-Connection
 "What Did I Do"
 "You're Making a Big Mistake" by The Hitchhikers
 "Girl"
 "Gina's and Elvira's Theme" by Giorgio Moroder (performed by Helen St. John)
 "Journee"
 "Good Inside" by Bobby Lyle
 "Make It Clear"
 "I Can't Live Without Your Love" by Teddy Pendergrass
 "Mega Fresh X"
 "9mm Goes Bang" by Boogie Down Productions
 "Live and Learn"
 "What More Can a Girl Ask For" by The Whispers

Charts

References

External links 
 Legal Hustle.net

Cormega albums
2009 albums
Albums produced by Nottz
Albums produced by DJ Premier
Albums produced by Large Professor
Albums produced by Khrysis
Albums produced by Easy Mo Bee
Albums produced by Pete Rock
Albums produced by L.E.S. (record producer)
Albums produced by Ayatollah
Albums produced by Buckwild